Magne may refer to:

 Magne (given name), origin of and people with the given name
 Magne (surname), origin of and people with the surname
 , several ships of the Swedish Navy
 Magne Charge, an inductive charging system 
 Magne (My Hero Academia), a character in the manga series My Hero Academia

See also
 MagneRide, a magneto rheological suspension system
 Magne Robo Gakeen, an anime series
 Magné (disambiguation)